Na Wa is a district (amphoe) in Nakhon Phanom province, northeast Thailand.

Geography

Neighboring districts are (from the northeast clockwise): Si Songkhram, Phon Sawan, and in Sakon Nakhon province the districts Kusuman, Mueang Sakon Nakhon, Phanna Nikhom, and Akat Amnuai.

The main rivers are the Un and Yam.

History
The population of the district is made up of five tribes: Phu Thai, Saek, Yau, Kalueng, and Thai Isan. The Yau form the largest group. They came from Luang Prabang in modern-day Laos in the 16th century. Others immigrated from Ubon Ratchathani Province.

The district was established on 16 August 1971 as a minor district (king amphoe) by splitting off the three tambons, Na Wa, Na Ngua, and Ban Siao, from Si Songkhram District. On 22 March 1979 it was elevated to full district status. Three further sub-districts were created, Nakhun Yai in 1978, Lao Phatthana in 1979, and Tha Ruea in 1987.

The township Na Wa was created in 1963 as a sanitary district (sukhaphiban). Like all sanitary districts it was upgraded to a township (thesaban tambon) in May 1999.

Symbols
The district slogan is "Phra That temple of unity, beautiful silk cloth, making Thai handicrafts".
 
The district name Na Wa means 'fields of Wa trees' (Syzygium cumini), which were very common in the area in the past.

Administration 
Na Wa is divided into six sub-districts (tambons), which are further subdivided into 68 villages (mubans). Na Wa itself is a sub-district municipality (thesaban tambon) and covers part of tambon Na Wa. Each of the six tambons is administered by a tambon administrative organization (TAO).

References

External links

amphoe.com
Private website about Na Wa

Na Wa